Yasseen Mansour (Arabic: ياسين منصور; born 1961/1962) is an Egyptian billionaire businessman, part owner of the Mansour Group, and chairman of Palm Hills Developments. Mansour has multiple Credit Suisse accounts per Suisse secrets. In 2011 he was cleared of corruption charges after paying 250 million Egyptian pounds to the authorities.

Early life
Yasseen Mansour is one of five children of Loutfy Mansour (1909-1976), the founder of Mansour Group. Loutfy Mansour had four sons, Ismail, Youssef, Mohamed and Yasseen, and a daughter, Rawya. Two of his brothers are also billionaires, Mohamed Mansour and Youssef Mansour.

He earned a bachelor's degree from George Washington University.

Career
In 1986, Mansour joined Mansour Motors Group. He later co-founded Mansour & Maghraby Investment Development (MMID), a 60:40 partnership between his family's Mansour Group, and his cousin, former Minister of Housing, Ahmed El-Maghraby's family business, the Maghraby Group, which together are the majority owner of the large EGX listed real estate developer Palm Hills Development Company PHDC.CA.

Mansour was found to have multiple Credit Suisse accounts per Suisse secrets. In 2011 Mansour was cleared of corruption charges after paying 250 million Egyptian pounds to the authorities.  In September 2019, Forbes estimated his net worth at US$1.5 billion.

Personal life
Mansour is married with four children and lives in Cairo.

References

1960s births
Living people
Egyptian billionaires
George Washington University School of Business alumni
Year of birth uncertain
Egyptian business executives
Businesspeople from Cairo